The Ken Farmer Medal is named in honour of the Australian rules footballer, North Adelaide Football Club full forward Ken Farmer.  The medal is awarded to the South Australian Football League's (SANFL) top goalkicker at the end of the minor round of matches each season and was instigated in 1981.

Ken Farmer Medallists

External links
SANFL leading goalkickers 1877 - 2006
 Full Points Footy - SANFL Summary Chart

References 

Australian rules football awards
Awards established in 1981
South Australian National Football League
Australian rules football-related lists